is a three-part treatise on Buddhist philosophy and martial arts written in the 17th century by Takuan Sōhō, a Japanese monk of the Rinzai sect. The title translates roughly to "The Mysterious Records of Immovable Wisdom". The book is a series of three discourses addressed to samurai but applicable to everyone who desires an introduction to Zen philosophy, the book makes little use of Buddhist terminology and instead focuses on describing situations followed by an interpretation. Its contents make an effort to apply Zen Buddhism to martial arts.

Chapters
All three chapters/essays are addressed to the samurai class, and all three seek to unify the spirit of Zen with the spirit of the sword.

Of the three essays in the treatise, two were letters:

 Fudōchishinmyōroku, "The Mysterious Record of Immovable Wisdom", written to Yagyū Munenori, head of the Yagyū Shinkage-ryū school of swordsmanship and teacher to two generations of shōguns; and
 Taiaki, "Annals of the Sword Taia", (太阿記) written perhaps to Munenori or possibly to Ono Tadaaki, head of the Ittō school of swordsmanship and an official instructor to the shōguns family and close retainers.

Individually and broadly speaking, one could say that Fudōchishinmyōroku deals with technique, how the self is related to the Self during confrontation, and how an individual may become a unified whole.

Taiaki deals more with the psychological aspects of the relationship between the self and the other.

Between these, Reiroshu, "The Clear Sound of Jewels", deals with the fundamental nature of humans: how a swordsman, daimyō – or any person, for that matter – can know the difference between what is right and what is mere selfishness, and can understand the basic question of knowing when and how to die.

Fudōchishinmyōroku (The Mysterious Record of Immovable Wisdom) is divided into the following sections:
 The Affliction of Abiding in Ignorance
 The Immovable Wisdom of All Buddhas
 The Interval into Which Not Even a Hair Can Be Entered
 The Action of Spark and Stone
 Where One Puts the Mind
 The Right Mind and the Confused Mind
 The Mind of the Existent Mind and the Mind of No-Mind
 Throw the Gourd into the Water Push It Down and It Will Spin
 Engender the Mind with No Place to Abide
 Seek the Lost Mind
 Throw a Ball into a Swift Current and It Will Never Stop
 Sever The Edge Between Before and After
 Water Scorches Heaven, Fire Cleanses Clouds

Citations
Sōhō refers to many poems and sayings, including those of:
 Bukkoku Kokushi (1256–1316): A Buddhist priest 
 Saigyō (1118–90): A Shingon priest of the late Heian period famous for his wanderings and highly admired as a poet
 Mencius (372–289 BC): A Chinese philosopher, the most famous Confucian after Confucius himself
 Jien (1155–1225): Also widely known by the name Jichin; a poet and monk of the Tendai sect
 Mugaku (1226–86): A Chinese priest of the Linchi (Rinzai) sect, invited to Japan by Hojo Tokimune in 1278
 Shao K'ang-chieh (1011–77): A scholar of the Northern Sung Dynasty
 Zhongfeng Mingben (1263–1323): A Chinese Zen priest of the Yuan Dynasty
 The Pi Yen Lu, a collection of Zen problems, sayings and stories of the patriarchs
 The Ise Monogatari, a work of the ninth century
 The Doctrine of the Mean
 The Golden Light Sutra
 Li Po (Li T'ai Po, 701–62): One of the great poets of T'ang period China
 Ippen Shonin (1239–89): Founder of the Jodo sect of Pure Land Buddhism
 Hotto Kokushi (1207–98): A monk of the Rinzai sect who traveled to Sung China in 1249
 The Namu Amida Butsu, "Homage to the Buddha Amitabha"
 Kogaku Osho (1465–1548): An Arinzai monk who taught Zen to the Emperor Go-Nara
 The Fan-i Ming-i Chi, a Sung Dynasty Sanskrit-Chinese dictionary
 Bodhidharma: The first patriarch of Ch'an (Zen) Buddhism in China; he is said to have arrived in that country from India in either A.D. 470 or 520
 Ta Chien (637–713): Commonly known as Hui Neng; a pivotal figure in the development of Zen
 Daio Kokushi (1234–1308): A monk of the Rinzai sect who studied Buddhism in China
 Daito Kokushi (1282–1337): A follower of Daio Kokushi regarded to be the founder of Zen at Daitokuji
 Nai Chi Hsu T'ang (1185–1269): Also known as Hsu T'ang Chih Yu; a Chinese monk of Linchi Buddhism
 The Cheng Tao Ko, an early treatise on Zen

References

Martial arts books
Edo-period works
Edo-period books about Buddhism
Zen texts